Robert Bernard Sherman (December 19, 1925 – March 6, 2012) was an American songwriter, best known for his work in musical films with his brother, Richard M. Sherman. The Sherman brothers produced more motion picture song scores than any other songwriting team in film history. Some of their songs were incorporated into live action and animation musical films including Mary Poppins, The Happiest Millionaire, The Jungle Book, The Many Adventures of Winnie the Pooh, Chitty Chitty Bang Bang, The Slipper and the Rose, and Charlotte's Web. Their best-known work is "It's a Small World (After All)" possibly the most-performed song (in public) in history.

Early life
Robert Bernard Sherman was born on December 19, 1925, in New York City to Russian Jewish immigrants Rosa (Dancis) and Al Sherman. Al Sherman, a songwriter, paid for his son's hospital delivery costs with a royalty check that arrived that day for the song "Save Your Sorrow". His brother and songwriting partner, Richard, was born in 1928.  Sherman's father was a well-known Tin Pan Alley songwriter.

In his youth, Sherman excelled in violin, piano, painting and poetry. Following seven years of cross-country moves, the Shermans settled down in Beverly Hills, California. Some of the primary schools Sherman attended in Manhattan included PS 241 and the Ethical Culture Fieldston School, and in California, the El Rodeo School.
At Beverly Hills High School, Sherman wrote and produced radio and stage programs for which he won much acclaim. At age 16, Sherman wrote Armistice and Dedication Day, a stage play showing how American life was changed following the December 7, 1941 attack on Pearl Harbor. The play yielded thousands of dollars for war bonds and earned a special citation from the War Department.

World War II
In 1943, Sherman obtained permission from his parents to join the army at age 17.  Sherman was awarded the Purple Heart medal after being shot in the knee on April 12, 1945, an injury which forced him to walk with a cane for the rest of his life.
On April 29, 1945, Sherman was among the first soldiers who entered the Dachau concentration camp.
Other medals received by Sherman for service in the war were the Combat Infantryman Badge, two Battle Stars for his European-African-Middle Eastern Campaign Medal, an American Campaign Medal, a World War II Victory Medal, and a Good Conduct Medal, and several Army Weapons Qualifications badges.

While recuperating from his knee injury in Taunton and Bournemouth in England, Sherman became familiar with the United Kingdom and its culture.

Awards and decorations
During World War II Robert B. Sherman received these awards:

Education
Upon his return to the United States, Sherman attended Bard College in upstate New York where he majored in English literature and painting. Sherman served as editor-in-chief of Bard College's campus newspaper, The Bardian. At Bard, Sherman completed his first two novels, The Best Estate and Music, Candy and Painted Eggs. He graduated in 1949.

On May 12, 1990, Sherman received an honorary doctorate from Lincoln College.

Songwriting career
Sherman and his brother, Richard, began writing songs together on a challenge from their father, Al Sherman, who was a Tin Pan Alley songwriter ("No! No! A Thousand Times No!!", "You Gotta Be a Football Hero").

In 1958, Sherman founded the music publishing company, Music World Corporation, which later worked with Disney's BMI publishing arm, Wonderland Music Company. That same year, the Sherman brothers had their first Top 10 hit with "Tall Paul", sung by Annette Funicello. The success of this song attracted the attention of Walt Disney, who hired the Sherman Brothers as staff songwriters for Walt Disney Studios. While at Disney, the Sherman Brothers wrote their most-recognized song, "It's a Small World (After All)" for the 1964 New York World's Fair.

In 1965, the Sherman brothers won two Academy Awards for Mary Poppins, Best Original Score and Best Original Song, "Chim Chim Cher-ee". Since Mary Poppins premiere, Sherman earned nine Academy Award nominations, two Grammy Awards, four Grammy Award nominations and 23 gold and platinum albums.

Robert and Richard Sherman worked for Walt Disney until Disney's death in 1966. After leaving the company, the brothers worked freelance as songwriters on scores of motion pictures, television shows, theme park exhibits and stage musicals.

Their first non-Disney assignment was in 1968 in Albert R. Broccoli's motion picture Chitty Chitty Bang Bang, which garnered the brothers their third Academy Award nomination. In 1973, the Sherman brothers made history by becoming the only Americans ever to win first prize at the Moscow Film Festival for Tom Sawyer, for which they authored the screenplay.

In 1976, The Slipper and the Rose was picked to be the Royal Command Performance of the year, attended by Queen Elizabeth. A musical adaptation of Cinderella, The Slipper and the Rose features both song, score and screenplay by the Sherman brothers. That same year the Sherman brothers received a star on the Hollywood "Walk of Fame" across from Grauman's Chinese Theater.

Other box office film credits for the Sherman brothers include The Jungle Book (1967), The Aristocats (1970), The Parent Trap (1961), The Parent Trap (1998), Charlotte's Web (1973), The Many Adventures of Winnie the Pooh (1977), Snoopy, Come Home (1972), Bedknobs and Broomsticks (1971) and Little Nemo: Adventures In Slumberland (1992).

In 1974, the Sherman brothers' Tony-nominated Over Here! (1974) was the highest-grossing original Broadway musical of that year. The Sherman brothers wrote popular songs, including "You're Sixteen", which reached Billboard's Top 10 twice, with Johnny Burnette in 1960 and with Ringo Starr 14 years later, "Pineapple Princess" and "Let's Get Together".

In 2000, the Sherman brothers wrote the score for Disney's blockbuster film The Tigger Movie, their first major motion picture for Disney in more than 28 years.

In 2002, the stage musical Chitty Chitty Bang Bang became the most successful stage show produced at the London Palladium. In 2005, it premiered on Broadway at the Foxwoods Theatre (then the Hilton Theatre). The Sherman brothers wrote an additional six songs for the new stage productions.

In 2002, Sherman moved from Beverly Hills to London, England, where he continued to write and paint. In 2003, four Sherman brothers' musicals ranked in the "Top 10 Favorite Children's Films of All Time" in a British poll reported by the BBC. The Jungle Book (1967) ranked at No. 7, Mary Poppins (1964) ranked at No. 8, The Aristocats (1970) ranked at No. 9 and Chitty Chitty Bang Bang (1968) ranked at No. 1.

A Disney and Cameron Mackintosh production of Mary Poppins: The Stage Musical that premiered at the Prince Edward Theatre in December 2004 featured the Sherman brothers' classic songs.

In June 2005, Sherman was inducted into the Songwriters Hall of Fame with his brother, Richard. Also in June 2005, a tribute was paid to Sherman at the Théâtre de Vevey in Vevey, Switzerland by the Ballet Romand.

In 2006, Mary Poppins opened on Broadway and embarked on a world tour beginning in Göteborg, Sweden in 2008.

Chitty Chitty Bang Bang embarked on a tour of 29 cities in the U.S., ending in 2009.

Personal life

Marriage and family
Sherman married Joyce Ruth Sasner in 1953. Their first child, Laurie (b. 1955) was followed by Jeffrey (b. 1957), Andrea (1960-2019) and Robert (b. 1968). with five grandchildren: Joshua Kirshbaum (1990), Alex Sherman (1991), Amelia and Sarah Kirshbaum (1993) and Ryan Sherman (1995).

After Sherman's 2002 relocation to London, he and his brother, Richard, continued to collaborate on various musical plays, as well as a feature, animated, film musicals which incorporates their original story, song score and screenplay. The brothers traveled between Los Angeles, New York and London to facilitate their work.

Sherman died in London on March 6, 2012. His wife preceded him in death by 11 years. A public memorial service and funeral was held for Sherman on March 9, 2012, at Hillside Memorial Park and Mortuary in Culver City.

Painting and other artistry

A lesser-known aspect of Sherman's life was his painting which he had done since 1941 and kept private, except from his family and friends, until 2002. Sherman studied painting while attending Bard College, receiving a double degree in both Painting and English Literature. Sherman worked in various visual arts media, including clay and metal sculpture, but his focus was oil painting throughout the 1940s-1960s, when he switched to acrylics.

In April 2002, an exhibition of Sherman's paintings was held in London, England, at Thompsons' Gallery on Marylebone High Street. This marked the first public exhibition of his paintings since he started painting in 1941. Sherman exhibited his paintings in Florida and California. A series of Limited Edition Giclées of Sherman's art were published on canvas and paper.

Sherman's paintings which have appeared at the various exhibitions include: "On Route 9G" (c. 1949), "Self Portrait" (1970), "San Francisco (1970)", "Moses" (1977), "Carousel In The Country" (1982), "From the Dining Room (1982)", "Sacrifice" (1983), "Florid Window" (1984), "Geisha (1986)", "Fine Four Fendered Friend (2002)" and "Park Lane" (2003). On March 4, 2007, Sherman and his son, Robbie, donated limited edition prints of "Moses" and "Sacrifice" to the Giffnock Synagogue in Glasgow, Scotland. Sherman worked in metal sculpture, wrote poetry and short stories from an early age.

Later life achievements, autobiography, honors, tributes

 In 2000, the Sherman Brothers wrote the award-winning score to The Tigger Movie which achieved number one status in both theatrical box office and video sales.
 The Sherman Brothers' classic motion picture, Chitty Chitty Bang Bang, was adapted into a London West End Musical in 2002 and premiered at the London Palladium on April 16, 2002, featuring many new songs and a reworked score by both Sherman Brothers. It was nominated for a 2003 Laurence Olivier Theatre Award for Best New Musical.  The Sherman Brothers each received the "Musical Theatre Award" from the Variety Club of Great Britain that year as well for Chitty.  Chitty finished a record breaking, three and a half year run at the Palladium becoming the longest running show in the theatre's century long history.  2004 saw the premiere of Mary Poppins on the stage. In 2005, Poppins was nominated for nine Olivier Awards. In 2005 Chitty went to Broadway and was nominated for 9 Tonys and also began its nationwide (UK) tour.
 On June 9, 2005, Sherman was inducted into the Songwriters Hall of Fame alongside Bill Withers, Steve Cropper, John Fogerty, Isaac Hayes, David Porter and his brother, Richard M. Sherman.
 On November 16, 2006, the Cameron Mackintosh/Disney production of Mary Poppins made its Broadway premiere at the New Amsterdam Theater featuring the Sherman Brothers' classic songs.
 During a London press junket promoting the 40th anniversary DVD rerelease of The Jungle Book, Robert and Richard Sherman were witnessed by press working on a new song for Inkas in the same Brown's Hotel room where The Jungle Book was originally penned by the British writer, Rudyard Kipling, over a hundred years earlier.
 In February 2008 Chitty Chitty Bang Bang began a second UK tour.  In 2008 and 2009, Poppins premiered in numerous cities throughout the world including: Stockholm, Copenhagen, Budapest, Toronto, Shanghai, Sydney, Johannesburg, Amsterdam, Buenos Aires, São Paulo and Helsinki. Full UK and US tours of Poppins are also scheduled to commence in 2008 and 2009 respectively.
 On November 17, 2008, Robert and Richard Sherman were awarded the National Medal of Arts at the White House by President George W. Bush in the East Room. The National Medal of Arts is an award and title created by the Congress of the United States in 1984, for the purpose of honoring artists and patrons of the arts. It is the highest honor conferred to an individual artist on behalf of the people. Honorees are selected by the National Endowment for the Arts (NEA), and ceremoniously presented the award by the President of the United States.
 In May 2009, a documentary called The Boys: The Sherman Brothers' Story was released. In October 2009, Disney released The Sherman Brothers Songbook, a 59-track, two-CD compendium of their work for the studio spanning 42 years.
 On March 11, 2010, the Sherman Brothers were presented with a Window on Mainstreet Disneyland in Anaheim, California in honor of their contribution to Disney theme parks.  On May 17, 2010, the "Career Achievement Award" at The Theatre Museum's 2010 Awards Gala.
 On May 21, 2011, the Sherman Brothers were each awarded honorary doctorate degrees in Fine Arts from their alma mater, Bard College. This was Robert's second honorary doctorate. His first was granted by Lincoln College on May 12, 1990.

Robert B. Sherman Scholarship
In 2005, Robert Sherman established an annual scholarship award in his name through the BMI Foundation. The awardee is chosen by BMI's Lehman Engel program with some consultation with Sherman. The first awardee was announced in November 2006. Awardees are chosen for their excellence in musical comedy songwriting with an emphasis on lyric writing. Following is a list of the annual winners since the award's inception:

 2006 - Andrew Nellessen
 2007 - Michael Mitnick
 2008 (no award this year)
 2009 - Jeffrey Simno
 2010 - Andy Roninson

Moose: Chapters From My Life
 In 2013, Moose: Chapters From My Life, Sherman's autobiography, was edited by his son Robert J. Sherman and published by AuthorHouse Publishers. The book was acknowledged in the credits of the film Saving Mr. Banks which also features actors playing the Sherman Brothers. B. J. Novak portrayed Robert Sherman in the film.

Artistic tributes
 Marking the official UK book launch for Moose, Robert J. Sherman wrote and emceed a two-night cabaret called A Spoonful of Sherman which premiered at the St. James Theatre in London, England on January 6, 2014. The show was billed as "A Celebration of the Life, Times and Songs of Robert B. Sherman" and was received extremely well by the crowd and critics alike. The show took on a life of its own, subsequently enjoying a "sold out" return engagement later in the year at the same venue. The Original Cast Recording, double CD was produced by Nicholas Lloyd Webber and released by SimG Records in 2015.
 In 2017 A Spoonful of Sherman was revived, playing at the venue, "Live At Zédel" in London.
 On July 31, 2018, the Walt Disney Studios in Burbank, California renamed Soundstage A the Sherman Brothers Stage.
 In 2018 the first A Spoonful of Sherman UK/Ireland Tour began with previews on February 14, 2018, at the EM Forester Theatre in Tonbridge, Kent. The tour played in 28 cities in England, Scotland, Wales and the Republic of Ireland. Cast members for the tour included Sophie-Louise Dann, Mark Read, Glen Facey, Jenna Innes and Ben Stock.

List of works

Major film scores

 The Parent Trap, 1961
 In Search of the Castaways, 1962
 Summer Magic, 1963
 The Sword in the Stone, 1963
 Big Red, 1963
 Mary Poppins, 1964
 That Darn Cat!, 1965
 The Happiest Millionaire, 1967
 The Jungle Book, 1967
 The One and Only, Genuine, Original Family Band, 1968
 Chitty Chitty Bang Bang, 1968
 The Aristocats, 1970
 Bedknobs and Broomsticks, 1971
 Snoopy, Come Home, 1972
 Charlotte's Web, 1973
 Tom Sawyer, 1973
 Huckleberry Finn, 1974
 The Slipper and the Rose, 1976
 The Many Adventures of Winnie the Pooh, 1977
 The Magic of Lassie, 1978
 Magic Journeys, 1982
 Winnie the Pooh and a Day For Eeyore, 1983
 Little Nemo: Adventures in Slumberland, 1992
 The Mighty Kong, 1998
 Winnie the Pooh: Seasons of Giving, 1999
 The Tigger Movie, 2000
 The Jungle Book, 2016
 Christopher Robin, 2018

Motion picture screenplays
 A Symposium on Popular Songs (uncredited), 1962
 Mary Poppins, 1964 (treatment only, uncredited)
 The Adventures of Tom Sawyer, 1973
 The Adventures of Huckleberry Finn, 1974
 The Slipper and the Rose, 1976
 The Magic of Lassie, 1978
 Blue Echoes, 1982 (unproduced)
 Ferdinand the Bull, 1986 (TV screenplay)

Stage musicals

 Victory Canteen, 1971 (Ivar Theatre, L.A.)
 Over Here!, 1974 (Broadway, NY)
 Dawgs, 1983 (Variety Arts Center, L.A.)
 Busker Alley, 1995 (U.S. Tour)
 Chitty Chitty Bang Bang, 2002 (London)
 Mary Poppins, 2004 (London)
 On the Record 2004-5 (U.S. Tour)
 Chitty Chitty Bang Bang, 2005 (Broadway, NY)
 Chitty Chitty Bang Bang, 2005 (UK Tour)
 Busker Alley, 2006 (Broadway, NY – *one night only)
 Mary Poppins, 2006 (Broadway, NY)
 Chitty Chitty Bang Bang, 2007 (Singapore)
 Mary Poppins, 2008 (UK Tour)
 Chitty Chitty Bang Bang, 2008 (Second UK Tour)
 Mary Poppins, 2008 (Stockholm)
 Mary Poppins, 2009 (US Tour)
 Mary Poppins, 2009 (Copenhagen)
 Mary Poppins, 2009 (Budapest)
 Mary Poppins, 2009 (Shanghai)
 Mary Poppins, 2010 (Australia)
 Mary Poppins, 2009 (South Africa)
 Mary Poppins, 2009 (Amsterdam)
 Mary Poppins, 2009 (Helsinki)
 Summer Magic, 2012 (Morristown, Tennessee)
 The Jungle Book, 2013 (Chicago, Illinois)
 The Jungle Book, 2013 (Boston, Massachusetts)
 A Spoonful of Sherman, 2014 (London)
 Mary Poppins, 2015 (Vienna, Austria)
 Chitty Chitty Bang Bang, 2015–16 (UK Tour)
 Mary Poppins, 2015–16 (UK Tour)
 A Spoonful of Sherman, 2017 (London)
 A Spoonful of Sherman, 2018 (UK/Ireland Tour)
 A Spoonful of Sherman, 2019 (San Jose, CA)
 Mary Poppins, 2019 (London Revival)
 A Spoonful of Sherman, 2019 (Singapore)
 Bedknobs and Broomsticks, 2021 (UK Tour)

Theme park songs
"There's a Great Big Beautiful Tomorrow" for the 1964 New York World's Fair attraction Carousel of Progress as part of General Electric's Progressland pavilion, later moved to Disneyland then to Walt Disney World
"The Best Time of Your Life" for the Walt Disney World version of the Carousel of Progress, later replaced with the show's original theme in 1993.
"Miracles from Molecules" for Adventure Thru Inner Space
"One Little Spark" for Journey Into Imagination
The Many Adventures of Winnie the Pooh (attraction)
"It's a Small World (After All)" for the 1964 New York World's Fair attraction Pepsi Presents WALT DISNEY'S "it's a small world" - a Salute to UNICEF and the World's Children, then adapted to each Disney Park installation of "It's a Small World".
"The Astuter Computer Revue" for the 1982 premiere of the CommuniCore Exhibit at EPCOT.
"Magic Highways" for Rocket Rods
"Makin' Memories" for Magic Journeys
The Tiki, Tiki, Tiki Room for Walt Disney's Enchanted Tiki Room
"We Meet the World with Love" and "Meet the World" for the same exhibit in Tokyo Disneyland

Autobiographic booksWalt's Time: From Before to Beyond A joint autobiography by both Robert and Richard Sherman published in 1998.Moose: Chapters From My Life  Robert B. Sherman's official memoirs posthumously released in 2013.

Professional awards

Academy Awards
1965 Won Academy Award in the category of "Best Original Song" for "Chim Chim Cher-ee" from Mary Poppins1965 Won Academy Award in the category of "Best Substantially Original Score" for Mary Poppins1969 Nominated Academy Award in the category of "Best Original Song" for "Chitty Chitty Bang Bang" from Chitty Chitty Bang Bang1972 Nominated Academy Award in the category of "Best Original Song" for "The Age of Not Believing" from Bedknobs & Broomsticks1972 Nominated Academy Award in the category of "Best Scoring: Adaptation and Original Song Score" for Bedknobs & Broomsticks1974 Nominated Academy Award in the category of "Best Scoring: Adaptation and Original Song Score" for Tom Sawyer1978 Nominated Academy Award in the category of "Best Original Song" for "The Slipper and the Rose Waltz" from The Slipper and the Rose1978 Nominated Academy Award in the category of "Best Scoring: Adaptation and Original Song Score" for The Slipper and the Rose1979 Nominated Academy Award in the category of "Best Original Song" for "When You're Loved" from The Magic of LassieAnnie Awards
2000 Nominated Annie in the category of "Outstanding Individual Achievement for Music in an Animated Feature Production" for the song "Round My Family Tree" from The Tigger Movie2003 Winsor McCay Award for lifetime achievement and contribution to animation

BAFTA Awards
1977 Nominated Anthony Asquith Award for Film Music for The Slipper and the RoseBMI
1977 Pioneer Award awarded in Los Angeles, California
1991 Lifetime Achievement Award awarded at the Beverly Wilshire Hotel in Los Angeles, California

Christopher Award
1964 Christopher Award for "Best Original Song Score" for Mary Poppins1973 Christopher Award for "Best Original Song Score" for Tom SawyerDisney
1985 "Mousecar" awarded at the Hollywood Bowl in Hollywood, California in front of 20,000 people
1990 "Disney Legends" awarded at the Walt Disney Studios in Burbank, California
2010 Main Street, U.S.A. Window presented at Disneyland in Anaheim, California in honor of the Sherman Brothers' contribution to Disney theme parks.

Golden Globes
1965 Nominated Golden Globe in the category of "Best Original Score" for Mary Poppins1969 Nominated Golden Globe in the category of "Best Original Score" for Chitty Chitty Bang Bang1969 Nominated Golden Globe in the category of "Best Original Song" for "Chitty Chitty Bang Bang" from Chitty Chitty Bang Bang1974 Nominated Golden Globe in the category of "Best Original Score" for Tom Sawyer1977 Nominated Golden Globe in the category of "Best Original Score" for The Slipper and the RoseGolden Videocassette Award
1984 Best Selling Video Cassette (of all time) for Mary PoppinsGrammy Awards
1965 Won Grammy in the category of "Best Original Score for a Motion Picture or Television Show" for Mary Poppins1965 Won Grammy in the category of "Best Recording for Children" for Mary Poppins1966 Nominated Grammy in the category of "Best Recording for Children" for Winnie the Pooh and the Honey Tree1968 Nominated Grammy in the category of "Best Recording for Children" for The Jungle Book1970 Nominated Grammy in the category of "Best Recording for Children" for Chitty Chitty Bang Bang1971 Nominated Grammy in the category of "Best Recording for Children" for The Aristocats1973 Nominated Grammy in the category of "Best Original Score for a Children's Show" for Snoopy Come Home1974 Nominated Grammy in the category of "Best Original Score for a Musical Show" for Over Here!1975 Won Grammy in the category of "Best Recording for Children" for Winnie the Pooh and Tigger TooLaurel Awards
1965 Won Golden Laurel in the category of "Best Song" "Chim Chim Cher-ee" for Mary Poppins1965 2nd Place Golden Laurel in the category of "Music Men"
1966 3rd place Golden Laurel in the category of "Best Song" "That Darn Cat!" for That Darn Cat!Moscow Film Festival
1973 First Place Award in the category of "Best Music" for Tom SawyerNational Medal of Arts
2008 National Medal of Arts awarded to Richard and Robert Sherman on November 17, 2008, at the White House by President George W. Bush. This is the highest honor the United States Government bestows on artists.

Olivier Awards
2002 Nominated "Best Musical" for Chitty Chitty Bang BangSongwriters Hall of Fame
2005 induction at the Marriott Hotel on Times Square in New York City

Theatre Museum Award
2010 Career Achievement Award presented on May 17, 2010, at the Players Club in New York City

Variety Club Awards
2003 Won "Best Musical" for Chitty Chitty Bang BangWalk of Fame
1976 A star on the Hollywood Walk of Fame awarded to "Richard & Robert Sherman" on November 17, 1976, located at 6914 Hollywood Boulevard

See also
Music WorldArmistice and Dedication DayWalt's Time: from before to beyondMoose: Chapters From My LifeReferences

Further reading
 Sherman, Robert B. Moose: Chapters From My Life. Bloomington, IN: AuthorHouse Publishers, 2013.
 Sherman, Robert B. Walt's Time: from before to beyond. Santa Clarita: Camphor Tree Publishers, 1998.
 Greene, Katherine and Richard. Inside The Dream: The Personal Story of Walt Disney. New York: Disney Editions, 2001.
 Peterson, Monique. Disney's The Little Big Book of Pooh. New York: Disney Editions, 2002.
 Tietyen, David. The Musical World of Walt Disney''. Milwaukee, Wisconsin: Hal Leonard Publishing Corporation, 1990.

External links

 Redstring Productions - Sherman Brothers
Music World Corporation
Robert Sherman Art
BMI Foundation - Robert B. Sherman Annual Scholarship
Robert B. Sherman BMI Foundation Annual Scholarship 11.08.06 article
Robert B. Sherman BMI Foundation Annual Scholarship 12.14.07 article

Robert B. Sherman at SoundUnwound
A Spoonful of Sugar: Robert Sherman, 1925–2012 Obituary on theartsdesk.com, March 6, 2012
 

1925 births
2012 deaths
20th-century American dramatists and playwrights
20th-century American painters
21st-century American essayists
21st-century American painters
20th-century sculptors
United States Army personnel of World War II
American autobiographers
American expatriates in the United Kingdom
American Impressionist painters
American male essayists
American male dramatists and playwrights
American male novelists
American male painters
American male screenwriters
American memoirists
American musical theatre lyricists
American musical theatre composers
American people of Ukrainian-Jewish descent
Annie Award winners
Animation composers
Beverly Hills High School alumni
Bard College alumni
Best Original Music Score Academy Award winners
Best Original Song Academy Award-winning songwriters
Broadway composers and lyricists
Burials at Hillside Memorial Park Cemetery
Disney imagineers
Ethical Culture Fieldston School alumni
Grammy Award winners
Impressionist sculptors
Jewish American composers
Jewish American songwriters
Jewish American musicians
Jewish painters
Military personnel from New York City
Modern painters
Novelists from New York (state)
Screenwriters from California
Screenwriters from New York (state)
Robert B.
Robert B.
Songwriters from California
Songwriters from New York (state)
United States National Medal of Arts recipients
United States Army soldiers
Walt Disney Animation Studios people
Walt Disney Theatrical
20th-century American male writers
21st-century American male writers